The following is a general historical timeline of the city of Los Angeles, California in the United States of America.

Prior to 20th century

 1781 – El Pueblo de Nuestra Señora de Los Angeles de Porciuncula founded in colonial New Spain by 44 settlers, 20 of whom were of African American or Native American descent.
 1818 – Avila Adobe built.
 1830 – Population: 730.
 1835 – Los Angeles becomes capital of Mexican California.
 1846 – September: Siege of Los Angeles by U.S. forces.
 1847 – January 10: Los Angeles taken by U.S. forces.
 1848 – February 2: Los Angeles becomes part of U.S. territory per Treaty of Guadalupe Hidalgo.
 1850
 April 4: Los Angeles incorporated.
 September 9: Los Angeles becomes part of the new U.S. state of California.
 Population: 1,610 city; 3,530 county.
 Los Angeles County established.
 1851 – Los Angeles Star, city's first newspaper, begins publication. Hugo Reid, who was married to indigenous woman Victoria Reid published his series  The Indians of Los Angeles County in the newspaper as part of his campaign to be named Indian agent 
 1854 – Round House constructed.
 1855 – First City public school building built.
1859 – Los Angeles County votes to secede from California to form the Territory of Colorado, voting 1,407–441 in favor of secession. Congress throws out secession proposal the following year amid the Civil War.
 1860 – Los Angeles Soap Company in business, founded by John A. Forthmann. 
 1865 – Loyola High School (Los Angeles) opens.
 1866 – Town Square established.
 1868 – Street lighting installed.
 1869 – Los Angeles & San Pedro Railroad begins operating.
 1871
 October 24: Anti-Chinese unrest.
 Evening Express newspaper begins publication.
 San Pedro Harbor development begins.
 1872 – First African Methodist Episcopal Church established.
 1873 – Los Angeles Daily Herald newspaper begins publication.
 1875 – Los Angeles and Independence Railroad begins operating to Santa Monica.
 1876
 September 6 – Southern Pacific Railroad (San Francisco-Los Angeles line) begins operating Los Angeles' first link to transcontinental railroad.
 Cathedral of Saint Vibiana built.
 1877
 First oranges shipped to eastern markets.
 1880
 University of Southern California opens.
 Population: 11,183 city; 33,381 county.
 1881 – Los Angeles Daily Times begins publication.
 1882 – Los Angeles State Normal School opens.
 1883 – City Railroad Company established.
 1884 – Child's Grand Opera House opens.
 1886
 Kansas City-Los Angeles railway begins operating.
 City Fire Department and Elysian Park established.
 Pasadena and Santa Monica incorporated in Los Angeles County.
 Many people arrive as a result of railroad rate war; speculative real estate boom begins.

 1887
 Peak of real estate boom; many towns laid out.
 Los Angeles Athletic Club incorporated.
 April 20 – Occidental College founded.
 Pomona incorporated in Los Angeles County.
 1888
 Land boom collapses.
 Southern Pacific's Arcade Depot opens.
 Chamber of Commerce founded.
 California Club incorporated.
 Long Beach incorporated in Los Angeles County.
 1889
 City Parks Department and Los Angeles Oil Exchange founded.
 Orange County established.
 1890 – Population: 50,400 city; 101,454 county.
 1891 – Courthouse built.
 1892
 Redondo Beach incorporated in Los Angeles County.
 February – Oil discovered within Los Angeles City limits.
 1893
 Bradbury Building constructed.
 July 4 – Mount Lowe Railway opens north of Pasadena.
 1894 – Fiesta de Los Angeles begins.
 1895
 Highland Park becomes part of the City of Los Angeles.
 Los Angeles Consolidated Electric Railway taken over by bondholders and renamed the Los Angeles Railway 
 1896
 May – Congress approves $2,900,000 for deep-water harbor at San Pedro.
 1897 – Los Angeles Country Club founded.
 1898
 September 1: Henry E. Huntington and Isaias W. Hellman syndicate purchase Los Angeles Railway and begin expanding it
 March 5: Griffith Park presented to Los Angeles by Col. Griffith J. Griffith.
 1899
 Garvanza and University district become part of the City of Los Angeles.
 Construction begins on Los Angeles Harbor, San Pedro.

20th century

1900s–1940s

 1901
 Angels Flight funicular begins operating.
 Children's Hospital founded.
 November 1 – Huntington group incorporates the Pacific Electric Railway of California 
 1902
 Tally's Electric Theater opens.
 Los Angeles takes over water system.
 1903
 Los Angeles Examiner newspaper begins publication.
 Braly Building constructed.
 1905
 Los Angeles and Salt Lake Railroad begins operating.
 Design of the seal of the City of Los Angeles adopted.
 Vernon incorporated in Los Angeles County.
 1906
 Alexandria Hotel in business.
 Shoestring strip, to connect Wilmington to Los Angeles, annexed to City of Los Angeles.
 Glendale, Huntington Park, and Watts incorporated in Los Angeles County.
 1907
 Port of Los Angeles and City Club of Los Angeles established.
 Silver Lake Reservoir built.
 Los Angeles Ostrich Farm and Los Angeles Alligator Farm open.
 1908
 Mount Wilson Observatory begins operating in Los Angeles County.
 October 1: Construction begins on Owens River Aqueduct.
 1909
 Selig Polyscope Company relocates to Los Angeles.
 City Market Wholesale Produce Terminal built.
 San Pedro and Wilmington become part of the City of Los Angeles.
 1910
 October 1: Los Angeles Times bombing.
 East Hollywood and Hollywood become part of City of Los Angeles.
 Population: 319,200 city; 504,131 county.
 1911
 Nestor Studios begin operating.
 Pacific Electric Railway Company created from merger of eight streetcar companies.
 Los Angeles College created. 
 Burbank incorporated in Los Angeles County.
 San Fernando incorporated in Los Angeles County.
 1912 – County of Los Angeles Public Library established.
 1913
 Los Angeles Aqueduct completed.
 La Brea Tar Pits excavation begins.
 1914
 Southern Pacific's Central Station and Southwest Museum open.
 "First ship via Panama Canal arrives."
 Beverly Hills incorporated in Los Angeles County.
 1915
 Universal Studios begins operating.
 San Fernando Valley becomes part of City of Los Angeles.
 Breed Street Synagogue active.
 Japan-Los Angeles steamship begins operating.
 Area of city: 288 square miles.
 1916
 Westgate becomes part of City of Los Angeles.
 Lincoln Motion Picture Company in business.
 1917 – Culver City incorporated in Los Angeles County.
 1918
 Warner Bros. Studios begin operating.
 Los Angeles Philharmonic and Otis College of Art and Design founded.
 1919
 September – Southern branch of University of California is  founded.
 1920
 Population: 576,673 city; 936,455 county.
 Douglas Aircraft Company in business in nearby Santa Monica.
 1921
 Hollywood Legion Stadium opens.
 Hollywood Masonic Temple and Hollyhock House (residence) built.
 Watts Towers sculpture construction begins.
 Chouinard Art Institute founded.
 Ambassador Hotel in business.
 1922
 KFI, KHJ and KNX radio stations begin broadcasting.
 Hollywood Bowl (amphitheater) and Grauman's Egyptian Theatre open.
 Rose Bowl completed in Pasadena.
 1923
 Post World War I building boom reaches its peak.
 Hollywoodland sign erected.
 Los Angeles Memorial Coliseum opens.
 Biltmore Hotel in business.
 Angelus Temple built.
 Illustrated Daily News begins publication.
 1924 – Harding High School established.
 1925
 Grand Olympic Auditorium opens.
 Junior League www.jlla.org and Yogananda Self-Realization Fellowship established.
 1926
 Orpheum Theatre, El Capitan Theatre, and 28th Street YMCA open.
 June – New Central Public library building completed.
 Shrine Auditorium rebuilt.
 Venice and Watts become part of City of Los Angeles.
 La Opinión Spanish-language newspaper begins publication.
 1927
 Grauman's Chinese Theatre opens.
 5 May, Hollywood Roosevelt Hotel opens for business.
 Barnsdall Art Park established.
 1928
 Los Angeles City Hall built.
 March 13: Collapse of St. Francis Dam in nearby San Francisquito Canyon.
 Huntington Library opens in Los Angeles County.
 1929
 August: Graf Zeppelin (aircraft) arrives from Tokyo.
 Academy Awards begin.
 Los Angeles Board of Trade Building and Bullocks Wilshire department store built.
 Nuart Theatre opens.
 1930
 Olvera Street restored.
 Hollywood Reporter begins publication.
 Greek Theatre and Pantages Theatre open.
 Highland Park synagogue built.
 Population: 1,238,048 city; 2,208,492 county.
 Burbank airport begins operating.
 1931
 The Chateau Marmont is converted from an apartment building to a hotel.
 Figueroa Street Tunnels open.
 1932 – 1932 Summer Olympics held.
 1933
 March 10: 1933 Long Beach earthquake.
 June 6: Frank L. Shaw becomes mayor.
 October 12: Los Angeles Garment Workers Strike of 1933 begins.
 Los Angeles Sentinel newspaper and Daily Variety begin publication.
 1934 – Los Angeles Science Fiction Society formed.
 1935 – Griffith Park Planetarium dedicated.
 1936
 Roman Catholic Archdiocese of Los Angeles established.
 Crossroads of the World shopping mall built.
1937
 Los Angeles purchases Mines Field for a municipal airport.
 1938
 Los Angeles flood of 1938.
 China City developed.
 CBS Columbia Square built.
 Mayor Shaw ousted; Fletcher Bowron becomes mayor.
 1939
 Union Station opens.
 Chandler's fictional detective novel The Big Sleep published.
 1940
 Arroyo Seco Parkway opens.
 United States Court House built.
 1941
 Los Angeles Airport in operation.
 Pueblo Del Rio housing complex built.
 Turnabout Theatre of puppets established.
 1942
 US-Mexico Bracero program begins.
 Parking meters installed.
 Battle of Los Angeles occurs.
 1943 – Ethnic Zoot Suit Riots occur.
 1944 – Imperial Courts and Jordan Downs housing projects built.
 1946
 Los Angeles Rams football team active.
 Kosher Burrito in business.
 1947 – KTLA television begins broadcasting.
 1948 – In-N-Out Burger is founded
 1949 – Los Angeles Valley College opens in the Valley Glen neighborhood of Los Angeles in the San Fernando Valley.

1950s–1970s

 1950
 Fictional Sunset Boulevard film released.
 Population: 1,970,358 city; 4,151,687 county.
 1951 – Los Angeles Metropolitan Transit Authority created.
 1953 – Four Level Interchange highway begins operating.
 1954 – Church of Scientology and Getty Museum open.
 1955
 Nickerson Gardens housing complex built.
 Disneyland amusement park opens in nearby Anaheim.
 1956 – Capitol Records Tower built.
 1957 – Ferus Gallery of art opens.
 1958 – Los Angeles Dodgers baseball team active.
 1959
 Los Angeles Memorial Sports Arena opens.
 Grammy Award begins.
 KPFK radio begins broadcasting.
 Sister city relationships established with Eilat, Israel; and Nagoya, Japan.

 1960
 July: 1960 Democratic National Convention held.
 Hollywood Walk of Fame established.
 Los Angeles Lakers basketball team active.
 1961 
 Theme Building constructed at Los Angeles Airport.
 Pacific Electric Railway ceases operations (last line in service was Long Beach Line
 1962
 Los Angeles Herald-Examiner newspaper in publication.
 City Cultural Heritage Board created.
 Dodger Stadium opens.
 Sister city relationship established with Salvador, Brazil.
 1963
 Vincent Thomas Bridge opens.
 Century City development begins.
 1964
 Whisky a Go Go nightclub and Dorothy Chandler Pavilion (concert hall) opens.
 UCLA Labor Center and Los Angeles Master Chorale founded.
 Sister city relationship established with Bordeaux, France.
 1965
 August 11–17: Watts Riots.
 Los Angeles County Museum of Art opens on Wilshire Boulevard.
 Marina del Rey harbor opens in Los Angeles County.
 1966
 Los Angeles Zoo opens.
 Gemini G.E.L. art studio founded.
 1967
 Super Bowl I is held at the Los Angeles Memorial Coliseum.  
 City's Community Analysis Bureau established.
 Two California Plaza built.
 The Advocate newsletter begins publication.
 Mark Taper Forum (theatre) and Brockman Gallery of art open.
 Forum (arena) opens in nearby Inglewood.
 Los Angeles Kings hockey team active. 
 Sister city relationship established with Berlin, Germany.
 1968
 June 5: Assassination of Robert F. Kennedy at the Ambassador Hotel.
 Sister city relationship established with Lusaka, Zambia.
 1969 - The Tate–LaBianca murders are committed by the Manson Family cult/commune/gang who are arrested by year's end.
 Sister city relationship established with Mexico City, Mexico.
 Formation of the Crips and Pirus
 1970 – Chinatown Service Center established.
Former Leave it to Beaver actor Ken Osmond joins the Los Angeles Police Department
The trial of the Manson Family cult starts on July 15.
 1971
 January 25: Charles Manson and his cult's members are convicted of the Tate-LaBianca Murders. 
 February 9: 1971 San Fernando earthquake.
 March 29: The Manson Family is sentenced to death.
 Six Flags Magic Mountain (originally named Magic Mountain) opens in Valencia. 
 Los Angeles Convention Center opens.
 California Institute of the Arts opens in nearby Valencia.
 Sister city relationships established with Auckland, New Zealand; and Busan, South Korea.
 1972
 Womanhouse art event occurs.
 Self Help Graphics & Art active.
 Sister city relationships established with Mumbai, India; and Tehran, Iran.
 1973
 Tom Bradley becomes mayor.
 Aon Center built.
Formation of the Bloods
 1974 – Security Pacific Plaza built.
 1975 – Chinese Historical Society of Southern California founded.
 1976 – Los Angeles City Historical Society founded.
 1977 – X (musical group) formed.
 1978
 L.A. Weekly begins publication.
 President Carter makes his first visit (May 4)
 Los Angeles Conservancy founded.
 1979 – Sister city relationship established with Taipei, Taiwan.
President Carter makes his second visit (May 5) 
The City Council passes Los Angeles' first homosexual rights bill on June 1 which Mayor Bradley sings on the next day, June 2.

1980s–1990s
 1980 – Population: 2,966,850 city; 7,477,421 county.
 1981 – Sister city relationship established with Guangzhou, China.
Centers for Disease Control (CDC) publishes the first report from here of symptoms of what would be later known as AIDS, with Los Angeles at least second or third highest reporting city for it after New York's #1 and San Francisco's # 2.
Mötley Crüe formed.   
 1983
 Crocker Tower built.
 Red Hot Chili Peppers (musical group) formed.
 1984
 L.A. surpasses Chicago as the second largest city in the United States. 
 1984 Summer Olympics held.
 Forever 21 clothier in business.
 "Power of Place" group formed.
 West Hollywood incorporated in Los Angeles County.
 Sister city relationships established with Athens, Greece; and Saint Petersburg, USSR.
 1985 – Latino Theater Company founded.
City Council passes Los Angeles anti-AIDS-discrimination bill that Mayor Bradley signs
"Night stalker", aka Night Prowler killer Richard Ramirez is arrested in East Los Angeles.
 1986
 Devastating fire at the Central Library. 
 Coalition for Humane Immigrant Rights of Los Angeles established.
 Los Angeles Opera active.
 Sister city relationship established with Vancouver, British Columbia, Canada.
 Proposition U passed
 1988 – Museum of Jurassic Technology founded.
 1989
 U.S. Bank Tower built.
 Sister city relationship established with Giza, Egypt.
 1990
 Hollywood Bowl Orchestra founded.
 Sanwa Bank Plaza built.
 Population: 3,485,398.
 Sony Pictures Entertainment headquartered in nearby Culver City.
 Sister city relationship established with Jakarta, Indonesia.
 Metro Blue Line opens, re-establishing light rail in the city
 1991
 Gas Company Tower and 777 Tower built.
 Maxine Waters becomes U.S. representative for California's 29th congressional district.
 Sister city relationship established with Kaunas, Lithuania.
 1992
 April 29: Rodney King riots begin.
 Koreatown Immigrant Workers Alliance founded.
 Sister city relationship established with Makati, Philippines.
 1993
 Richard Riordan becomes mayor
 Los Angeles County Metropolitan Transportation Authority created.
 Metro Red Line opens.
 Sister city relationship established with Split, Croatia.
 1994 – January 17: 1994 Northridge earthquake.
 1995
 City website launched.
 Los Angeles Independent Film Festival and LA as Subject project begin.
 Drudge Report begins publication.
 Metro Green Line opens.
 1996
 Loyola Marymount University's Center for the Study of Los Angeles founded.
 Council on American–Islamic Relations Los Angeles chapter founded.
 Museum of Television & Radio opens in Beverly Hills.
 1997
 American Apparel clothier headquartered in Los Angeles.
 The Getty Center opens in Brentwood.
 1998 – Los Angeles Almanac begins publication.
 California Science Center opens to the public. 
 1999 – Staples Center (sports arena) opens.
 2000
 August: 2000 Democratic National Convention held.
 Los Angeles Police Rampart scandal report issued.

21st century

 2001 
 James Hahn becomes mayor 
Kodak Theatre opens.
 Disney California Adventure opens adjacent to Disneyland.  
 2002 – Cathedral of Our Lady of the Angels built.
 2003
 Walt Disney Concert Hall and Chinese American Museum open.
 Los Angeles Derby Dolls (rollerderby) team formed.
 Metro Gold Line opens.
 2004 – National Day Laborer Organizing Network headquartered in Los Angeles (approximate date).
 2005
 Los Angeles Homeless Services Authority homeless census begins.
 Antonio Villaraigosa becomes mayor.
 Sister city relationship established with San Salvador, El Salvador.
 Metro Orange Line opens.
 2006
 LA Weekly Detour Music Festival begins.
 Sister city relationships established with Beirut, Lebanon; and Ischia, Italy.
 Metro Purple Line opens.
 2007
 May 1: 2007 MacArthur Park rallies.
 Los Angeles Theatre Center opens.
 Sister city relationship established with Yerevan, Armenia.
 2008 – Anime Expo first arrives at the Los Angeles Convention Center
 2009 – Los Angeles Times''' Mapping L.A. project begins.
 Metro Sliver Line opens.
 2010
 Population: 3,792,621 city; 9,818,605 county; metro 12,828,837.
 Area of city: 503 square miles.
 2011
 October 1: Occupy Los Angeles begins.
 QuakeBot in use.
 2012 
Metro Expo Line opens.
 Los Angeles Review of Books begins publication.
 Wilshire Grand Tower, the new tallest building in the city begins groundbreaking in downtown LA.
 September 19–21: Endeavour makes final landing at LAX.
 FIGat7th Reopens the newly constructed center happened in fall 2012.
 2013
 Eric Garcetti becomes mayor.
 Population: 3,884,307.
 2014
 DataLA'' (city data website) begins publication.
 The long-stalled Metropolis Towers breaks ground and begins construction in downtown LA.
 2015
 August: Shade balls put into Los Angeles Reservoir during 2015 California drought.
 A massive natural gas leak in the Santa Susana Mountains near Porter Ranch, also known as Aliso Canyon gas leak, was discovered.
 2016 
 Los Angeles Rams NFL football team moves back to Los Angeles.
 ET94 Space Shuttle fuel tank arrives in LA at the California Science Center.
 2017
 Measure S fails
 Los Angeles Chargers NFL football team moves back to Los Angeles.
 Los Angeles population reaches 4 million.
 2018 – Woolsey Fire burns across Los Angeles and Ventura counties.
 2019
 Typhus outbreak spreads in Los Angeles.
 Teachers in LA went on strike at the beginning of the year with about 30,000 following a string of success across the country.
 The construction of $44 million affordable housing of low income in Willowbrook, California, is now completed.
 Construction of Oceanwide Plaza, halted in 2019 in Downtown LA.
 2020
 American professional basketball player Kobe Bryant dies in a helicopter crash.
 Los Angeles was hardest-hit by COVID-19 pandemic, which put few thousands of residents out of work, and shifted others to work at home.
 Oceanwide Plaza remains uncompleted as Chinese foreign real estate investment capital pulled out due to the China–United States trade war.
 48 apartments could replace single family home in downtown L.A.
 Hotel-Residential project at Wilshire takes another step forward, which will be completed in 2023. There are 14 residences in affordable units.
 2021 – SoFi Stadium opens in Inglewood, which occupies the former site of the Hollywood Park Racetrack.
 2022
Los Angeles Rams win NFL Super Bowl LVI at SoFi Stadium.
Amazon announced that it will be opening its first clothing store in Los Angeles.
 2028
 2028 Summer Olympics held.
 2028 Summer Paralympics held.

See also
 History of Los Angeles
 List of mayors of Los Angeles
 List of districts and neighborhoods of Los Angeles
 National Register of Historic Places listings in Los Angeles, California
 Timeline of California
 Timelines of other cities in the Southern California area of California: Anaheim, Bakersfield, Long Beach, Riverside, San Bernardino, San Diego, Santa Ana

References

Bibliography

 
 
 
 
 
  + Chronology

External links

 

 
Los Angeles
Los Angeles-related lists
Los Angeles